The 1915 World Series was the championship series in Major League Baseball for the 1915 season. The 12th edition of the World Series, it matched the American League champion Boston Red Sox against the National League champion Philadelphia Phillies. The Red Sox won the Series four games to one. It was the last World Series to start on a Friday until the 2022 World Series.

In their only World Series before , the Phillies won Game 1 before being swept the rest of the way. It was 65 years before the Phillies won their next Series game. The Red Sox pitching was so strong in the 1915 series that the young Babe Ruth was not used on the mound and only made a single pinch-hitting appearance.

Series arrangements
Arrangements for the Series were made on October 2, 1915, in a meeting of the team owners, league presidents and the National Commission at the Waldorf-Astoria Hotel in midtown Manhattan, New York City. Red Sox owner Joseph Lannin lost the coin toss for home field advantage, and Phillies owner William F. Baker chose to have the first two games of the Series in Philadelphia. The league presidents selected the umpires, and it was announced that J. G. Taylor Spink would be one of the official scorers.

One controversy surrounded the allocation of tickets to the Red Sox' Royal Rooters fan club. Each visiting team was allocated 200 tickets, but the Red Sox requested an additional 400 on behalf of their supporters. The Phillies' Baker Bowl sat only 20,000, and their above-cited owner, William Baker, refused to allocate additional tickets for visiting fans. The matter was resolved by National Commission chairman Garry Herrmann, who gave the Red Sox tickets from the Commission's own Series allocation.

Series summary
The Phillies won Game 1 3–1, although The New York Times reporter Hugh Fullerton wrote of the future 300+ game-winning Hall of Famer, "[Grover Cleveland] Alexander pitched a bad game of ball. He had little or nothing" in his review of the game, headed "Nothing but luck saved the Phillies." The Times also reported that a crowd of 10,000 gathered in Manhattan's Times Square to view a real-time mechanical recreation of the game on a giant scoreboard sponsored by the newspaper.

The Phillies were not to win another postseason game until 1977, nor another World Series game until 1980.  The Red Sox swept Games 2–5, all by one run, and by identical scores of 2–1 in Games 2–4.

In Game 2, Woodrow Wilson became the first U.S. President to attend a World Series game.

This was the second straight year that a Boston team beat a Philadelphia team in the World Series after the Braves had swept the Athletics the year before.

Unlike the 1913 Series, where the home team won only one of the five games, home field was often very much an advantage in the 1915 October classic. Fenway Park, paradoxically the Braves' home field in their 1914 Series sweep of the A's while Braves Field was still being built, had been the home of the Red Sox for four seasons and was fully functional in 1915; yet the Red Sox played their 1915 Series "home" games in the brand-new Braves Field to take advantage of its larger seating capacity. Beyond the added revenue, the long ball was affected by this arrangement, as follows:

In the top of the third inning of Game 3 at Boston, with two out, one run in and two runners in scoring position, Phillies' slugger "Cactus" Gavvy Cravath hit a line drive to deep left field which was caught for a harmless inning-ending out in the spacious Braves Field outfield. In Fenway or Philadelphia's Baker Bowl, it might have been a home run or at least an extra-base hit which might have turned the Series around.
The Phillies had packed some extra outfield seats into their already-small bandbox of a ball-field, shortening the distance from home to the outfield wall even more. This proved crucial in the decisive Game 5, in which Boston's Harry Hooper twice homered over the moved-in center field fence and Duffy Lewis followed suit. In Braves Field, those would have been extra-base hits at best. Both of Hooper's hits, including the eventual game-winner in the top of the ninth, actually bounced over the fence and were home runs by the rules of that era although they would have been only ground-rule doubles by present-day rules.

Summary

Matchups

Game 1

Alexander scattered eight hits, winning 3–1, in giving the Phillies their only win of the series and their last until Game 1 of the 1980 Series.

Game 2

Rube Foster pitched a 3-hitter, allowing no walks, and retiring the last 10 Phillies he faced, and helped his own cause with the game-winning RBI single in the top of the ninth.

Game 3

Dutch Leonard and Grover Cleveland Alexander engaged in a classic pitcher's duel, Leonard retiring the last 20 Phillies to face him, winning 2–1 on an RBI single by Duffy Lewis in the bottom of the 9th.

Game 4

Ernie Shore held the Phillies scoreless until the eighth inning, winning 2–1, giving the Red Sox a 3–1 series lead.

Game 5

The Red Sox won on three home runs by two of their outfielders, two cheapies by Harry Hooper (see above) and one by Duffy Lewis. Fred Luderus homered for the Phillies only home run of the series in the bottom of the fourth inning. Those were the only round-trippers in the entire Series, the first four games being pitchers' duels. The Phillies were held to a weak .182 team batting average in the 5-game set.

Composite line score
1915 World Series (4–1): Boston Red Sox (A.L.) over Philadelphia Phillies (N.L.)

The winning margin of two runs remains the lowest for a five-game series, followed by three runs in 2000, and five runs in 1933, 1942, and 1974.

Notes

References

External links

World Series
Boston Red Sox postseason
Philadelphia Phillies postseason
World Series
Baseball competitions in Boston
Baseball competitions in Philadelphia
World Series
World Series
1910s in Boston
1910s in Philadelphia
October 1915 sports events